Seung-yoon is a Korean masculine given name. Its meaning differs based on the hanja used to write each syllable of the name. There are 15 hanja with the reading "seung" and 16 hanja with the reading "yoon" on the South Korean government's official list of hanja which may be registered for use in given names.

People with this name include:
Oh Seung-yoon (born 1991), South Korean actor
Kang Seung-yoon (born 1994), South Korean singer, member of boy band Winner
Lee Seung-yun (born 1995), South Korean archer

See also
List of Korean given names

References

Korean masculine given names